The U.S. state of Maryland has various policies regarding the production, sale, and use of different classes and kinds of drugs.

Specific drugs

Alcohol

As of July 2011, the sales tax for purchasing alcohol in Maryland is 9 percent.  According to former Governor Martin O'Malley, the tax increase is intended to raise $85 million for state programs.

Businesses that operate in the state of Maryland have certain requirements if they serve alcohol.  Any employee that handles alcohol must be at least 18 years of age. Bartenders and restaurant servers also have the responsibility of monitoring their customers' alcohol consumption in order to help prevent drunk driving.  If the bartender or server is shown to have known and purposefully neglected this responsibility, the employee can be held criminally responsible. They are also required to verify the age of those purchasing alcohol, to ensure consumers are of the legal age.  As of right now, the minimum legal age to purchase alcohol in Maryland is 21.

It is against the law to misrepresent one's age by using another's identification or a fake identification.  The penalties for this include: 
 fines of up to $2,000
 imprisonment of up to 3 years
 suspension or revocation of one's driver's license
If the violator is under the age of 18, she or he may be required to attend a supervised work or alcohol rehabilitation program, and the violator's guardian(s) may be asked to withdraw consent for the violator to hold a license.

Drinking and Driving

When a prospective driver is given a license in the state of Maryland, she/he is required to sign an agreement to submit to a blood alcohol test if asked by a police officer.  Refusal to take the test results in a 120-day suspension of the offender's license.  If the offender is detained a second time, and again refuses to take a blood alcohol test, an automatic one-year suspension of the offender's license goes into effect.  

Driving drunk is punished with fines, license suspension, and jail time.  The penalties vary depending on the circumstances.  

If the offender is under the age of 21 and shown to have a blood alcohol level of 0.02% or higher, the offender's license may be revoked or suspended and the offender may face a fine of up to $500.

The legal blood alcohol content limit for anyone over the age of 21 is 0.08%, in which case the driver may be charged with a DWI (driving while intoxicated).  If the offender is driving with a blood alcohol content of 0.04-0.08%, she/he can be cited for driving under the influence.  If the offender is considered to be intoxicated, the penalties are as follows:
 a 45-day license suspension for the first offense
 a 90-day license suspension for the second offense
 loss of driving privileges
If the offender is transporting a minor at the time, the offender may face a fine of up to $4,000 and a prison sentence of up to four years.

If the offender is a first-time offender, or has not had any convictions of DUI/DWI in the past ten years, then the offender can plead for Probation Before Judgement (PBJ).  PBJ is pleading "not guilty" with intention that the offender gets placed on probation before they have been found guilty of the crime they have been charged for. This prevents the charge on the individuals record in compliance that the violation never occurs again, and that their record will maintain being charge-free.

Cannabis

A medical necessity defense is available for medical cannabis cases under a law passed in 2003. The state has some mandatory minimum sentences in place.  Currently, the state permits a defendant to prove that she/he is using cannabis for medical reasons, in which case there is a maximum penalty of $100.

However, there is discussion to change the current Maryland law to permit medical cannabis possession and use after filing an application.  Democratic Governor Martin O'Malley says that he will veto the bill if it is passed in the legislature.  O'Malley is said to take this position because he fears that, due to the current federal law prohibiting all possession and use of marijuana, state employees involved in its processing might be subject to arrests.

Cocaine
In the last decade, cocaine has been making a comeback in Maryland. Between 2008 and 2013, the number of cocaine-related deaths in Maryland remained constant. Between 2015 and 2016, the number of cocaine-related deaths increased 110%, it then increased 49% between 2016 and 2017, and finally by 29% between 2017 and 2018. The increase in cocaine-related deaths is largely attributed to cocaine usage in combination with opioids. In 2018, 82% of cocaine-related deaths occurred in combination with fentanyl. Nearly 900 people have died from cocaine related overdoses in Maryland in 2018. Of these, 423 deaths have occurred in Baltimore. Despite only accounting for 10% of Maryland’s population, Baltimore accounts for nearly half of cocaine related deaths. 

The sale, distribution and production of cocaine, is illegal and is considered felonies in every state. Possession of small amounts of cocaine can lead to serious penalties. Additionally, there is an increase in severity and punishment depending on whether the defendant has prior drug convictions and depending the quantity of drugs involved. 

The table below outlines the charges and penalties under Maryland's cocaine laws. 

However, these penalties may not be applied to all offenders as prosecutors can offer plea bargains in exchange for helping to build a case against those higher up the chain such as producers and dealers. Furthermore, first-time or second-time offenders may be offered time spent in rehabilitation rather than in jail. 

Additionally, violating Maryland’s controlled dangerous substances laws as a first time offender allows the individual to qualify pleading Probation Before Judgement. Utilizing this statute is pleading not guilty and for probation before the charged crime is to be found guilty. There are guidelines to whom this applies to and any individual who has two or subsequent violations of Maryland’s controlled dangerous substances laws are not eligible.

See also 

 Annotated Code of Maryland
 Federal drug policy of the United States

References 

Controlled substances in Maryland
Maryland law